Huddersfield Grammar School is a coeducational independent school located in Huddersfield in West Yorkshire, England. The school was established in 1995 on the site of the former independent St David's School, which closed on 1 September 1995.  St David's school had been purchased and merged with the former independent Kayes College in 1995 

Since 2007 the school has been owned and operated by the Cognita Group. It is the largest independent school in Huddersfield to offer both primary and secondary education.

In 2014, Cognita invested £3.5 million at Huddersfield Grammar School to further enhance the school's site and facilities.

References

External links
 Huddersfield Grammar School website

Private schools in Kirklees
Educational institutions established in 1958
Educational institutions established in 1995
Schools in Huddersfield
Cognita
1958 establishments in England
1995 establishments in England